Thomas Antonius Cornelis Ancion (born 3 March 1957), known by the pseudonym Thom Hoffman, is a Dutch actor and photographer.

Biography 
Hoffman acts mainly in serious roles, especially those of complicated characters.  His film debut was Luger under director Theo van Gogh in 1982 and since then has played more than twenty roles in films and TV series.  He calls himself "more of a hard worker than a good actor"; he never studied formally to become an actor.

Since 1991 he has  worked in photography, also without professional training.

Hoffman married actress Giam Kwee on 30 July 2005.

Partial filmography

 1981 Luger as Chris Luger
 1982 Sprong naar de liefde as Freddy
 1983 The Fourth Man as Herman
 1984 De Witte Waan as Lazlo
 1985 Tracks in the Snow as Ron
 1986 Als in een Roes Diederik Van Avezaat
 1986 45º parallelo as Tom
 1986 The Washing Water as Maurice de Wilde
 1987 Odyssée d'amour as Bart Buisman
 1987 Looking for Eileen as Philip de Wit
 1988 Shadowman as Fuchs
 1989 Force majeure as Hans
 1989 Rituals as Philip Taads
 1989 De Kassière as Arend
 1989 Evenings as Frits Van Egters
 1990 Dilemma as Jef Mees
 1991 Eline Vere as Vincent Vere
 1991 De provincie as Frank
 1992 Orlando as King William of Orange
 1992 De Bunker as Gerrit Kleinveld
 1992 Rooksporen
 1993 False Light as Wesley
 1993 Hoffman's honger as Sonnema, Secretaris
 1994 It Will Never Be Spring as Emile Lombardo
 1996 The Cold Light of Day as Alexi Berka
 1996 Naar de Klote! as D.J. Cowboy
 1998 Sentimental Education
 1998 Regrets
 1999 Molokai: The Story of Father Damien as Dr. William Saxe
 1999 Shabondama Elegy as Jack
 1999 Unter den Palmen as Thomas
 2000 De Omweg as Camille Kleber
 2000 Le birdwatcher as Charles Williamsen
 2000-2004 Russen (TV Series) as Paul de Vos
 2001 Soul Assassin as Inspector Willem
 2002 Bella Bettien as Frans Van Rijn
 2002 Het Everzwijn (Short) as Jim
 2003 Dogville as Gangster
 2003 Klem in de Draaideur as Arthur Docters Van Leeuwen
 2006 Black Book as Hans Akkermans
 2009 Carmen van het noorden as Simon
 2010 Kom niet aan mijn kinderen as Wouter Siemons
 2010 Sintel (Short) as Shaman (voice)
 2011 De Eetclub as Simon Vogel
 2012 De Overloper (TV Movie) as Mario Keizer
 2012  Dokter Tinus as Martinus Elsenbosch (hoofdrol Dokter Tinus)
 2013 La marque des anges - Miserere as Sean Singleton

References

External links

1957 births
Living people
Dutch male film actors
Dutch male television actors
Dutch male stage actors
Dutch male musical theatre actors
Dutch photographers
Golden Calf winners
Knights of the Order of the Netherlands Lion
Academic staff of Tilburg University
People from Wassenaar